The Grand Lodge of New York (officially, the Grand Lodge of Free and Accepted Masons of the State of New York) is the largest and oldest independent organization of Freemasons in the U.S. state of New York.  It was at one time the largest grand lodge in the world in terms of membership.

The Grand Lodge of New York was founded December 15, 1782 and it acts as the coordinating body for many Masonic functions undertaken throughout the state. Its various committees organize the Masonic Home in Utica, the Livingston Masonic Library and various charitable events around New York State. The Grand Lodge of New York has jurisdiction over approximately 60,000 Freemasons, organized in more than 800 Lodges, most of them located within New York State.

History

Colonial and federalist eras: 1730–1820
It is not known when the first Freemason set foot in the American colony of New York, but the first documented presence dates from the mid-1730s, when Daniel Coxe Jr. (1673–1739), was appointed by the Duke of Norfolk, the Grand Master of the Premier Grand Lodge of England (known to historians as the "Moderns"), to act as a Provincial Grand Master for the provinces of New York, New Jersey, and Pennsylvania. No authenticated records exist of his tenure as Provincial Grand Master, and he died a few years after his appointment. Thus, it seems doubtful that he exercised any authority in  Masonic endeavors.  From 1738 to the 1780s, additional Warrants were issued by the GLE (Moderns) to Francis Goelet (1738–1753), to George Harrison (1753–1771) and to Sir John Johnson (1771–1783). As Johnson was a supporter of the British during the American Revolution, he is believed to have taken his warrant with him when he fled to Canada, thus leaving the Moderns Lodges without a Provincial Grand Master.

To further complicate matters, by the 1750s, the Antient Grand Lodge of England (known to historians as the "Ancients"), a rival Masonic Grand Lodge, had also created a Provincial Grand Lodge of New York, which subsequently chartered lodges under its own jurisdiction. Additional lodges were chartered in New York by the Grand Lodge of Scotland and the Grand Lodge of Ireland.  The Ancients retained their charter throughout the Revolution, however, and it was based upon this charter that an independent Grand Lodge of New York was created in 1781, with Robert R. Livingston as Grand Master. The Grand Lodge of New York was officially organized on December 15, 1782, under the Provincial Grand Warrant dated September 5, 1781, from the “Athol” or Antient Grand Lodge of England. The Grand Lodge declared its independence and assumed its modern title “Grand Lodge of Free and Accepted Masons of the State of New York” on June 6, 1787. While the "Athol" Charter descended from the "Ancients", Livingston himself was a member of a "Modern" Lodge.  Thus the two rival Grand Lodge traditions, which in England did not unite until 1813, had already merged before that in New York State.

Grand Lodge Building

Early Masonic meetings and meetings of the Grand Lodge were likely held at taverns as well as an early iteration of Tammany Hall. On June 24, 1826 the cornerstone was laid for a Gothic style Masonic Hall on Broadway in lower Manhattan between Reade and Pearl Streets, directly across from the original site of the New York Hospital. This would serve as the home of the Grand Lodge until it the building was demolished in 1856. Due to infighting in the Grand Lodge, the Panic of 1857, and the Civil War, it would not be until the 1870s, that the Grand Lodge would again have a permanent meeting location. In 1870, the cornerstone was laid for a new Second French Empire Style building which served as the headquarters of the Grand Lodge from 1875 to 1911. This 1875 Grand Lodge building was designed by Napoleon LeBrun and due to the Panic of 1873 it would take five years to complete, at the staggering cost of $1.279 million dollars. By the turn of the 20th Century, the Second Empire style was already considered outdated and coupled with rising NYC real estate prices, the 1875 temple was replaced with the current more modern skyscraper.

The current Grand Lodge building is located at 23rd Street and 6th Avenue and was built in 1911, on the same site as the 1875 Grand Lodge Building.

Other Lodge Buildings in Manhattan

Although today all Grand Lodge of New York lodges in Manhattan meet at the Grand Lodge Building, this was not always the case and is likely a consequence of the high property taxes in New York City. One former Masonic lodge building at 15th Street, home to a number of German-speaking Masonic lodges, is now in use by Friend's Seminary. In addition the Prince Hall Masonic Temple located at 155th Street first served as the Masonic Temple for the William McKinley Lodge.

Noteworthy Lodges
St. John's Lodge, chartered in 1757, is the oldest operating Lodge under the jurisdiction of the Grand Lodge of New York. St. John's Lodge is the custodian of what is now known as the George Washington Inaugural Bible. On April 30, 1789, it was upon this Bible that George Washington took his oath of office as the first president of the United States. In 2009, the Lodge formed a registered public charity for the purpose of preserving, maintaining and restoring the George Washington Inaugural Bible. In 2014, the St. John's Lodge No. 1 Foundation, Inc. received recognition as an IRS 501(c)3.

Holland Lodge No. 8 was founded in 1787 and originally conducted ritual in the Dutch language. It is the largest lodge by membership currently in the Grand Lodge of New York, and was the lodge in which Franklin Delano Roosevelt took his Masonic degrees.

Community and charity
The Grand Lodge of New York has a long history of supporting charitable causes. Among the organizations that are rooted in its charitable endeavors are, the Masonic Medical Research Institute, Acacia Village and Masonic Home in Utica; the Chancellor Robert R. Livingston Library and Museum in New York and Utica; the Masonic Youth Camp at Camp Turk in Woodgate; the DeWint House at Tappan and its many charitable activities of its annual Brotherhood Fund Drive.  The Grand Lodge sponsors drug and alcohol awareness programs in schools, and gives thousands of dollars a day to worthy charities around the State.

The Masonic youth group Organization of Triangles, Inc., was founded in New York in 1925.

Racial and Religious Equality
Since 2001, the Grand Lodge of New York has had mutual recognition with the Prince Hall Grand Lodge of New York.

In May 2012, at its Grand Lodge Session, Grand Lodge of New York approved the findings of a Special Committee which has determined that certain Grand Lodges, notably those following the Swedish Rite, restrict their membership to members of the Christian faith.  As a consequence of this, the members of the Grand Lodge of New York voted unanimously that non-Christian Masons living in these Grand Jurisdictions would not come under the exclusivity enjoyed by said Grand Lodges.  A notice was sent out to all Grand Lodges with which the Grand Lodge of New York is in amity, that the Grand Lodge of New York will recognize as Regular any Lodges opened up in these territories by any other regular Grand Lodge.

Grand Masters

The current Grand Master is Richard Kessler.
1781-1783 William Walter
1783-1784 William Cock
1784-1800 Robert R. Livingston
1801-1805 Jacob Morton
1806-1819 DeWitt Clinton
1820-1821 Daniel D. Tompkins
1822-1824 Joseph Enos
1825-1829 Stephen Van Rensselaer
1830-1843 Morgan Lewis
1844-1845 Alexander H. Robertson
1846-1849 John D. Willard
1850 William H. Milnor
1850 Henry S. Atwood
1851 Oscar Coles
1852 Nelson Randall
1853 Reuben H. Walworth
1854-1855 Joseph D. Evans
1856-1859 John L. Lewis Jr.
1860 John W. Simons
1861 Finlay M. King
1862 John J. Crane
1863-1864 Clinton F. Paige
1865-1866 Robert D. Holmes
1867 Stephen H. Johnson
1868-1869 James Gibson
1870-1871 John H. Anthon
1872-1873 Christopher G. Fox
1874-1875 Ellwood E. Thorne
1876 James W. Husted
1877 Joseph J. Couch
1878 Edmund L. Judson
1879 Charles Roome
1880 Jesse B. Anthony
1881 Horace S. Taylor
1882 Benjamin Flagler
1883 J. Edward Simmons
1884 William A. Brodie
1885-1888 Frank R. Lawrence
1889-1890 John W. Voorman
1891 William Sherer
1892 James Ten Eyck
1893 Frederick A. Burnham
1894 John Hodge
1895-1896 John Stewart
1897-1898 William A. Sutherland
1899 Wright D. Pownall
1900-1901 Charles W. Mead
1902-1902 Elbert Crandall
1904-1905 Frank H. Robinson
1906-1907 Townsend Scudder
1908-1909 S. Nelson Sawyer
1910-1911 R. Jodson Kenworthy
1912-1913 Charles Smith
1914-1915 George Freifeld
1916-1917 Thomas Penney
1918-1919 William S. Farmer
1920-1921 Robert H. Robinson
1922-1923 Arthur S. Tompkins
1924-1925 William A. Rowan
1926-1927 Harold J. Richardson
1928-1929 John A. Dutton
1930-1931 Charles H. Johnson
1932-1933 Chris C. Mollenhauer
1934-1935 Robert Elliott Owens
1936-1937 Jacob Charles Klinck
1938-1939 Dana B. Hellings
1940-1941 Henry C. Turner
1942-1943 William Frederick Strang
1944-1945 Charles W. Froessel
1946-1947 Gay H. Brown
1948-1949 Frank M. Totton
1950-1951 Richard A. Rowlands
1952-1953 Ward B. Arbury
1954-1955 Raymond C. Ellis
1956-1957 Nathan Turk
1958-1959 H. Lloyd Jones
1960-1961 Carl W. Peterson
1962-1963 Harry Ostrov
1964-1965 Clarence J. Henry
1966-1967 Frank C. Staples
1968-1969 Charles F. Gosnell
1970-1971 William R. Knapp
1972-1973 Lloyd S. Cochran
1974-1975 Arthur Markewich
1976-1977 Albert W. Schneider
1978-1979 William R. Punt
1980-1981 Bruce Widger
1982-1983 Ernest Leonardi
1984-1985 Calvin G. Bond
1986-1987 Robert C. Singer
1988-1989 Roswell T. Swits
1990-1991 Richard P. Thomas
1992 Sheldon K. Blank
1993-1994 Gary A. Henningsen
1995-1997 Earle J. Hino Jr.
1998-1999 Stewart C. McCloud
2000-2001 Carl J. Smith
2002-2003 Carl J. Fitje
2004-2005 Edward R. Trosin
2006-2008 Neal I. Bidnick
2008-2009 Edward G. Gilbert
2010-2011 Vincent Libone
2012-2013 James E. Sullivan
2014-2015 William J. Thomas
2016-2018 Jeffery M. Williamson
2018-2021 William M. Sardone
2021-2023 Richard J. Kessler

Notes

External links
 The Grand Lodge of Free and Accepted Masons of New York
 Masonic Medical Research Institute
 Masonic Care Community of New York 
 The Chancellor Robert R Livingston Masonic Library of New York

Grand Lodge of New York
New York
Freemasonry in the United States
23rd Street (Manhattan)